NASSCO may refer to:

National Steel and Shipbuilding Company
National Association of Sewer Service Companies